The Newton Municipal School District is a public school district based in Newton, Mississippi (USA).

In addition to Newton, it includes a small portion of Lake.

Schools
Newton High School
N. H. Pilate Middle School
Newton Elementary School 
Newton Career Center

Demographics

2006–07 school year
There were a total of 1,046 students enrolled in the Newton Municipal School District during the 2006–2007 school year. The gender makeup of the district was 48% female and 52% male. The racial makeup of the district was 90.54% African American, 9.08% White, 0.10% Hispanic, and 0.29% Asian. 76.2% of the district's students were eligible to receive free lunch.

Previous school years

Accountability statistics

See also
List of school districts in Mississippi

References

External links
 

Education in Newton County, Mississippi
School districts in Mississippi